Martelé may refer to:

 Martelé (bowstroke), in music
 Martelé (silver), in silversmithing

See also
 Martel (disambiguation)